Newington is a district of South London, just south of the River Thames, and part of the London Borough of Southwark. It was an ancient parish and the site of the early administration of the county of Surrey. It was the location of the County of London Sessions House from 1917, in a building now occupied by the Inner London Crown Court.

History

Toponymy
The name means "new farmstead" to refer to a newer part of the manor of Walworth. It lay on the old Roman road from London to West Sussex, specifically directly to Chichester (also linking to London/Westminster much of Surrey including Kingston and Guildford) (this was one of the Stane Streets). The proximity to London meant stalls, stables and stores were by the late medieval period numerous. The first mention of Newington (or Neweton) occurs in the Testa de Nevill (a survey of feudal tenure officially known as the Book of Fees compiled 1198–1242) during the reign of Henry III, wherein it is stated that the queen's goldsmith holds of the king one acre of land in Neweton, by the service of rendering a gallon of honey. In 1313 it is mentioned again in the Archbishop of Canterbury's Register as Newington juxta London. The name survives now in the street names Newington Causeway and Newington Butts and in the open space Newington Gardens, on the site of Horsemonger Lane Gaol (1791–1878).

Newington as a ward currently is a name for one of the equal-electorate drawn divisions of councillors of the London Borough of Southwark, covering from Walworth Road up to the borough's western limit with South Lambeth, Lambeth.

Urban development

The area remained as a farming village with a low level of population until the second half of the 18th century. There was a little industry, for example, the manufacture of clay pipes for tobacco smoking. In William Shakespeare's time, there was a theatre called Newington Butts and later there were further theatres.  Newington gained in importance with the creation of the Westminster Bridge in 1750 and the associated improvements of London Bridge which required a series of new roads across St George's Fields to interconnect the routes from them and allow traffic from the Georgian West End to travel south and to Southwark without transitting through the City. These routes were Westminster Bridge Road and Borough Road for the West End and Southwark; for the route to the south London Road and St George's Road supplemented and by-passed the Borough High Street and Newington Causeway. All of these roads converged at a junction where there was a blacksmith's forge and inn called Elephant and Castle which then became a name to signify the area. Traffic heading to the south-east from the West End was connected to the older route from the City of London and Southwark to Kent as New Kent Road from Newington to a junction with the older route at the Bricklayers Arms.  New roads brought development opportunities. The local landowner, Henry Penton (Member of Parliament (MP) for Winchester), started to sell some of his farmland. The 19th century brought more dense speculative house building, and some philanthropic provision too. The Trinity House Newington Estate, laid out on property the institution was left in the seventeenth century, became a high class residential district which is still largely in existence. It was built around an 1820s classical church by Francis Octavius Bedford.

Further urban stimulus was given by the arrival of mainline railway routes from the City to the south, the London, Chatham and Dover Railway built a station at Elephant and Castle in 1863. In 1890 the City and South London Railway (now the Northern line City Branch of London Underground) was projected through the area with stations at what was termed 'Kennington' (but in fact within Newington) and also at Elephant. In 1906 the new Bakerloo line terminated at the Elephant also.

Local governance
The parish of Newington St Mary was part of the Brixton Hundred of Surrey and this contained all of the manor of Walworth. Before the creation of elected County Councils, in 1889, the county Magistrates were responsible for ensuring compliance with local bye-laws and ordinances, so that with the creation of the new Surrey County Sessions House at Newington Causeway in 1792 Newington was the County Town, until Kingston on Thames was designated as such in 1893. In 1855 it came within the area of responsibility of the Metropolitan Board of Works and the parish vestry was incorporated as a local authority. In 1889 it became part of the County of London. There was a reorganisation of local government in 1900 and the parish became part of the Metropolitan Borough of Southwark and the vestry was abolished. The civil parish was finally abolished in 1930.

Newington is a ward within the London Borough of Southwark and the Parliamentary seat of Bermondsey and Old Southwark.  It is represented by Councillors Eleanor Kerslake and Alice Macdonald of the Labour Party and James Coldwell, Independent.

Ecclesiastical parish
The ancient parish, dedicated to St Mary, was in the Diocese of Winchester until 1877, then the Diocese of Rochester until 1905, since when it is in the Diocese of Southwark. From 1826, as the population of Newington increased, ten new parishes were formed:
  Holy Trinity, Newington in 1826
 St Peter, Walworth in 1826
 St Paul, Newington in 1857
 St John, Walworth in 1860
 All Saints, Newington in 1866
 St Matthew, Newington in 1868
 St Mark, Walworth in 1870
 St Stephen, Walworth Common in 1871
 All Souls, Grosvenor Park in 1871
 St Andrew, Newington in 1877

Small parts of the above augmented other parishes, later:
 St Agnes, Kennington Park in 1874 with parts of St Mary, Lambeth
 St Mark, Camberwell in 1880 with parts of St Giles, Camberwell

Politics

Under the Metropolis Management Act 1855 any parish that exceeded 2,000 ratepayers was to be divided into wards; as such the incorporated vestry of St Mary Newington was divided into four wards (electing vestrymen): No. 1 or St Mary's (18), No. 2 or Trinity (18), No. 3 or St Paul's (15) and No. 4 or St Peter's (21).

In 1894 as its population had increased the incorporated vestry was re-divided into five wards (electing vestrymen): St Mary's (15), St Paul's (12), St Peter's (15), St John's (18) and Trinity (12).

People
The scientist Michael Faraday was born in Newington Butts, in 1791. Charles Babbage the promoter of the first computing machine was born in Walworth Road; William Jowett, a 19th-century missionary and author, was born in Newington in 1787, Also born in Newington, in Surrey Square in 1805, was the English artist Samuel Palmer, as was William John Swainson, the ornithologist and natural history artist (1789–1855) and Tom Smith (1823–1869), the creator of the Christmas cracker.

Geography
Nearest places:

 Walworth
 Kennington
 Bermondsey
 Vauxhall

Nearest tube stations:
 Kennington
 Borough
 Elephant & Castle
 Lambeth North
 London Bridge

Nearest railway stations:
 London Bridge
 Elephant & Castle
 Waterloo
 Blackfriars

References

External links
 Newington, Southwark — Hidden London
 Walworth, Newington and Elephant & Castle suburban development

Areas of London
Districts of the London Borough of Southwark
Parishes governed by vestries (Metropolis)